Per Ola Markus Lindgren (born 29 February 1964) is a Swedish former handball player and current coach. He is the head coach for IFK Kristianstad since 2012 and was head coach for Sweden from 2008 to 2016. As a player, he won two World Championships, four European Championships and participated in four Olympic Games. He also won four Swedish Championships with Drott.

Club career
Lindgren made his debut for Drott in 1981. He won Swedish Championships with the club in 1984, 1988 and 1990. In 1990 he joined German club TSV Dutenhofen but returned to Drott in 1992. He won a fourth Swedish Championship with Drott in 1994. He later played for German clubs HSG Düsseldorf from 1995 to 1998 and HSG Nordhorn from 1998 to 2003.

International career
In 1988 he was a member of the Swedish handball team which finished fifth in the Olympic tournament. He played all six matches and scored ten goals. Two years later he was part of the team that won the World Championship, playing all seven matches and scoring 13 goals. He was part of the Swedish team which won the silver medal at the 1992 Olympics. He played all seven matches and scored twelve goals. At the 1993 World Championship, he was a member of the Swedish team that captured a bronze medal. He played six matches in the tournament and scored 15 goals. In 1994, he was part of the Swedish squad that won the inaugural European Championship. In 1996 he won his second Olympic silver medal with the Swedish team. He played six matches and scored three goals. He also won a silver medal at the 1997 World Championship. In 1998 he was part of the Swedish team that won their second European Championship. A year later, he won his second World Championship. In 2000, he was a member of the Swedish team that won their second consecutive European Championship. He made his last Olympic appearance in the same year when he won his third consecutive silver medal with the Swedish team. He played all eight matches and scored four goals. In 2001, he was part of the Swedish squad that won silver at the World Championship. He won his last international medal in 2002 as Sweden won their third consecutive European Championship.

Coaching career
Lindgren started his coaching career as player-coach for HSG Düsseldorf between 1996 and 1998. He coached HSG Nordhorn from 2003 to 2009 and won the 2007–08 EHF Cup with the club. He coached Rhein Neckar-Löwen from 2009 to 2010. In addition to his club coaching career, he was assistant coach for Sweden from 2007 to 2008 and head coach from 2008 to 2016. During this time, Sweden reached the semi-finals of the 2011 World Championship and the final of the 2012 Summer Olympics. He became coach of Kristianstad in 2012 and won three consecutive Swedish Championships with the club from 2015 to 2017.

References 

1964 births
Living people
Swedish male handball players
Swedish handball coaches
Olympic handball players of Sweden
Handball players at the 1988 Summer Olympics
Handball players at the 1992 Summer Olympics
Handball players at the 1996 Summer Olympics
Handball players at the 2000 Summer Olympics
Olympic silver medalists for Sweden
Swedish expatriate sportspeople in Germany
Olympic medalists in handball
HSG Wetzlar players
Sportspeople from Halmstad
HK Drott players
Expatriate handball players
Handball-Bundesliga players
Medalists at the 2000 Summer Olympics
Medalists at the 1996 Summer Olympics
Medalists at the 1992 Summer Olympics
Sportspeople from Halland County